Graham Michael Charlesworth (born 15 February 1965) is an English former first-class cricketer and the coach of Oxford University Cricket Club. Charlesworth has played first-class and List A cricket for Griqualand West, Cambridge University, Impalas, and Combined Universities.

Charlesworth studied for his undergraduate degree at Durham University, where he won a full palatinate for cricket.

Career
Charlesworth made his List A debut in October 1989 in a Nissan Shield match for Griqualand West against Western Transvaal at the Fanie du Toit Sports Complex. Charlesworth bowled 9 overs for 32 runs, and scored 36* in the match. A month later, he made his first-class debut in a 1989/90 Castle Bowl match against Orange Free State B at Harmony Gold Mine Cricket Club A Ground. He took 1/91 in the first innings, and scored 19 and 43. At the same time, Charlesworth represented Impalas, a team that represented South African minor provinces, in the Benson & Hedges Series of 1989/90 and 1990/91. His highest first-class score was 81 for Griqualand West against Boland in a 1990/91 Castle Bowl match, and he made a single List A century in his career, in a 1990/91 Benson & Hedges Series match for Impalas against Eastern Province. In 1993, Charlesworth made first-class appearances for Cambridge University, and a single List A appearance for the Combined Universities in the 1993 Benson & Hedges Cup.

In 1993/94, Charlesworth captained Vredenburg-Saldanha; the team which included Ashley Giles. In the 1999/2000 season, Charlesworth was coach of the Griqualand West B team. From 2002 to 2009, Charlesworth played for Oxford cricket team, before moving to Abingdon Vale in 2010. Charlesworth joined Abingdon as a player, but also undertook some coaching responsibilities, and in 2012, he was appointed the team's captain. At the same time, Charlesworth worked as the coach of the Oxford University cricket team.

References

External links
 

Living people
People associated with the University of Oxford
1965 births
English cricketers of 1969 to 2000
Griqualand West cricketers
Cambridge University cricketers
English cricketers
English expatriates in South Africa
British Universities cricketers
Alumni of the College of St Hild and St Bede, Durham